Hendrik Feldwehr (born 18 August 1986) is a German swimmer, who swam at the 2012 Summer Olympics.

References

External links 
 
 
 

Living people
1986 births
Sportspeople from Bremerhaven
German male swimmers
World Aquatics Championships medalists in swimming
Swimmers at the 2012 Summer Olympics
Olympic swimmers of Germany